Mathieu Wojciechowski (born 20 October 1992) is a French-Polish basketball player for CSP Limoges of the LNB Pro A. Wojciechowski usually plays at the power forward position.

Professional career
In July 2015, Wojciechowski signed with Limoges CSP of the French LNB Pro A. He spent the 2017-18 season with JL Bourg, but left the team on 16 August 2018 with two years remaining on his contract.

On 11 July 2019 he signed with Śląsk Wrocław of the PLK.

On 22 June 2020 he signed with ESSM Le Portel of the LNB Pro A.

On June 8, 2022, he has signed with CSP Limoges of the LNB Pro A.

References

1992 births
Living people
BCM Gravelines players
ESSM Le Portel players
French men's basketball players
French people of Polish descent
JL Bourg-en-Bresse players
Limoges CSP players
MKS Dąbrowa Górnicza (basketball) players
Power forwards (basketball)
Polish men's basketball players
Śląsk Wrocław basketball players
Sportspeople from Calais